Dhaka University Central Students' Union, also known by its acronym DUCSU, is the official students' union of the University of Dhaka. Called the second parliament of Bangladesh, DUCSU represents Dhaka University students in the university's decision-making, to act as the voice for students in the national higher education policy debate, and to provide direct services to the student body.

History 
It was established in the academic year of 1923-24 as Dhaka University Student Union. Its first constitution was drafted in its general assembly on 30 October 1925. In 1953, its constitution was amended and the union was renamed  Dhaka University Central Students' Union. The chancellor of the university acts as the president of the Union while other posts are elected from the students representatives. A teacher acts as the treasurer. The last election was held in 1990. Upon the order from the High Court, an election is scheduled to be held on 11 March 2019.

Role in the politics of Bangladesh 
DUCSU is called the second parliament of Bangladesh. Some of the most consequential events in the history of Bangladesh—such as the language movement, six-point demands, 1969's mass uprising—that led to the creation of Bangladesh were led by DUCSU. Even after Bangladesh came into being, DUCSU continued to play a vital role, and contributed to the fall of Ershad's military regime. The importance of elected bodies under DUCSU is considered both in the light of the past role that DUCSU has played in national life, as well as in the transformation of university campus from political to social and cultural spaces.

DUCSU election, 2019 
Following a writ petition, the High Court Division of Bangladesh directed Dhaka University to hold DUCSU election in 2018. DUCSU election was scheduled to be held on 11 March 2019. S M Mahfujur Rahman, a professor of International Business Department was appointed as the chief returning officer in accordance with the clause 8(e) of DUCSU constitution. Five returning officers were appointed to assist the chief returning officer. A 7 members disciplinary committee had been formed to overlook disciplinary issues. Though all students organizations except Chhatra League demanded the polling booth to be located outside the residential halls, the DU syndicate decided that the polling booths be in the residential halls.

Nurul Haq Nur  of 'Bangladesh Sadharon Chhatra Odhikar Songrokkhon Parishad' won as vice-president, Golam Rabbani of 'Bangladesh Chhatra League' won as general Secretary and Saddam Hussain also of 'Bangladesh Chhatra League' won as Assistant General Secretary.

List of vice-presidents and general secretaries

DUCSU Law and Politics Review 
The DUCSU LPR is an academic journal about law, policy, politics and governance edited by the top most students of the country. DUCSU LPR aimed to enhance the research, writing and editing skills of the students of the University of Dhaka. The DUCSU leadership of 2019-20 aimed at creating University of Dhaka as the central hub for holding public policy debates with national and international policy makers, jurists and academicians and forming a bridge between the academia and the industry. To foster the aim of DUCSU, the Secretary, International Affairs, DUCSU, Shahrima Tanjin Arni constituted a student body to publish the DUCSU Law and Politics Review (DUCSU LPR). Md Azhar Uddin Bhuiyan was appointed as the Editor-in-Chief of the Journal on the last week of August, 2020. Soon the editorial board consisting of the brightest minds of the University of Dhaka was constituted. With the dissolution of 2019-20 elected committee of DUCSU on 22 June, the editorial board of DUCSU LPR also dissolved on the same date. Later on with the permission of the Dhaka University administration, the editorial board started functioning under a different nomenclature, 'Dhaka University Law and Politics Review' (DU LPR).

Blog and journal 
On 22 June 2020, the last day of the tenure of DUCSU 2019–20, DUCSU LPR successfully published the first student edited academic journal in the history of Dhaka University Central Students’ Union. In its near 1-year tenure, DUCSU LPR edited, published and reprinted articles authored by reputed scholars from home and abroad including Maitreesh Ghatak, Mizanur Rahman, Rachel M Heath and Ahmed Mushfiq Mobarak, Bahzad Joarder, Brian Wong etc. Salim Mahmud was the Chief Guest in the launching ceremony of the journal.

DU Thinks! 
DUCSU LPR hosted a ground-breaking public lecture series titled 'DU Thinks!'. In the series, the brightest students of the University of Dhaka based on their academic results were given the opportunity to address the key policy makers, academics and practitioners and talk about their academic theses authored in pursuance of their Bachelor/Masters programme. The editorial board could organize three such events in the midst of global COVID-19 crisis before the campus went for a vacation. In this series, the honorable Home Minister of the People's republic of Bangladesh Mr. Asaduzzaman Khan Kamal, MP, Monirul Islam etc. were present. The topics on which the DU Thinks! were hosted are as follows:

 Charisma as a resource of terrorist recruiters: Appeal, Process and Effects on the recruit in Bangladesh
 Presence of patriarchy in the advertisements of housekeeping and cosmetic products broadcast in Bangladesh Television
 Violent Extremism Funding in South Asia: A Comparative Study of Bangladesh, India and Pakistan

DUCSU LPR Student Dialogue 
DUCSU LPR organized a student dialogue on the issue of the then hyped dispute between Gambia and Myanmar on the issue of Rohingya genocide. The event was titled as "Gambia vs. Myanmar: Rohingya Genocide and Judgment of International Court". Justice AHM Shamsuddin Chawdhury Manik, Retired Judge, Appellate Division, Supreme Court of Bangladesh. Among others the Dean of the Faculty of Law, University of Dhaka, Md Rahmat Ullah was present.

DUCSU LPR Webinar Series 
In the midst of COVID-19 global pandemic, DUCSU LPR organized three webinars on issues of contemporary importance as well as core policy issues. In these three events, three Honorable Members of the Cabinet of Bangladesh were present.

DUCSU LPR Webinar 1.0

DUCSU LPR Webinar 1.0 was organized on the title "the NIKO Arbitration 2020: Political & Judicial Antecedent and Aftermath" on 16 May 2020. This event was chaired by Mr. Nasrul Hamid, MP, Honorable State Minister, Ministry of Power Energy & Mineral Resources, Government of the People's Republic of Bangladesh. Among the panel members there were Barrister Moin Ghani, Counsel for Petrobangla and BAPEX, Partner and Co-Head, Alliance Laws; and Rumana Islam, Professor, Department of Law, University of Dhaka. This event discussed the background, current situation and the aftermath of the NIKO arbitration decision where Bangladesh won an arbitration lawsuit against Niko Resources (Niko) as an international court has found the Canadian company responsible for the blowout incidents in Chattak gas field in Sunamganj more than 15 years ago.

DUCSU LPR Webinar 2.0

DUCSU LPR Webinar 2.0 was organized on the title "Blockchain in Bangladesh: Policy Roadmap for Innovation and Adaptations" on 31 May 2020. This webinar was chaired by Zunaid Ahmed Palak, Honorable State Minister for ICT Division, Ministry of Post, Telecommunications & Information Technology, People's Republic of Bangladesh. Among the panel members there were Barrister Morshed Mannan, PhD Researcher and Lecturer, Department of Company Law, Leiden University, Netherlands; and Mr. Sami Ahmed, Policy Advisor, LICT Project, Bangladesh Computer Council, ICT Division. This event placed policy recommendations in front of the Honorable State Minister for a better governance of the blockchain issues in Bangladesh.

DUCSU LPR Webinar 3.0

DUCSU LPR Webinar 3.0 was organized on the title "Transition to E- Learning: Higher Education in the Global South" on 15 June 2020. This webinar was chaired by Barrister Mohibul Hassan Chowdhury, MP, Honorable Deputy Minister, Ministry of Education, People's Republic of Bangladesh. Among the panel members there were Ahmed Mushfiq Mobarak, Professor of Economics, Yale University; A.S.M. Maksud Kamal, President, Dhaka University Teacher's Association; and Justin Reich, Director, MIT Teaching Systems Lab. This webinar discussed the policy issues for conducting online classes in the higher education in Global South.

References 

Students' unions
Student organisations in Bangladesh
Organisations based in Dhaka
1922 establishments in British India